Bashundhara Kings Women is a Bangladeshi women's football club affiliated with Bashundhara Kings. The team plays Bangladesh Women's Football League. Though the name of the club is Kings, it's a women's team.

History

Inception 
On 7 September 2019, the club officially announced the name of former national player Mahmuda Sharifa Oditi as their women's team coach. In October 2019, Bashundhara Kings officially informed the Bangladesh Football Federation that they want to participate in the much-awaited women's league. On 3 January 2020, it was revealed that Women's national team skipper Sabina Khatun is likely to play for Bashundhara Kings in the much-awaited Women's Football League.

2019–20 season 
Bashundhara Kings formed a strong team for the 3rd edition of the Women's Football League recruiting 23 booters, including 19 national players to finalize their squad during the transfer deadline day. They included National Women's team Captain Sabina Khatun, Bangladesh U-19 team captain Mishrat Jahan Moushumi and key players like Monika Chakma, Krishna Rani Sarkar, Maria Manda, Tohura Khatun, and Sanjida Akhter.

On 22 February 2020, Bashundhara Kings officially introduced their star-studded women's football team with a thoroughly dominating 12–0 win over Begum Anwara Sporting Club. Krishna struck four goals, Sabina netted three including the first-ever goal for the club within 45 seconds, Mishrat Jahan Moushumi scored two while Sheuli, Nargis Khatun and Maria Manda scored one goal each for the winners. On 1 March 2020, Bashundhara Kings recorded another big win in Tricotex Women's Football League when the title-contenders handed a 13–0 defeat on Spartan MK Gallactico Sylhet FC. Monika struck four goals, Sabina netted another hattrick while Akhi scored a brace. Krishna, Tohura and Sheuli netted one goal each while Mukta Das scored an own goal. On 5 March 2020, Sabina netted her third hat-trick in a row to guide Bashundhara Kings to their third consecutive victory with a 9–0 win over Nasrin Sports Academy. Tohura and Krishna scored two while Sanjida and Munni scored one goal each for the winners. On 9 March 2020, Bashundhara Kings brushed aside Cumilla United by 6-0 goals. Sabina and Maria Manda struck two goals each while Ripa and Tohura netted one goal each for the Kings. On 12 March 2020, Kings brushed aside Jamalpur Kacharipara Ekadash by 11-0 goals. Sabina and Tohura made hat-tricks scoring four and three goals respectively while Krishna netted two, Sanjida and Nargis scored one each for the winners.

On 7 November 2020, Kings resumed from where they had left off before the COVID-19 pandemic as they thrashed FC Uttar Bongo 7–0 in the Women's Football League. Krishna bagged a brace while Sheuli, Tohura, Munni, Monika Chakma and Sabina Khatun, who now has league-leading 17 goals, scored one apiece for the table-topper Kings.

On 6 December 2020, Kings continued their utter dominance in the domestic football arena by clinching the Women's Football League with a match to spare.

Shirt sponsors

Ground 
Since they do not possess a dedicated home stadium, the women's first team will play its home and away games in Bir Sherestha Shaheed Shipahi Mostafa Kamal Stadium along the years.

Players

Current squad

Competitive record

Coaching staff

Team records

Head coach's record

Top scorers

Honours

League 

 Bangladesh Women's Football League
  Winners (3): 2019–20, 2020–21, 2021–22

References

External links
  of Bashundhara Kings

Bashundhara Kings
2019 establishments in Bangladesh
Association football clubs established in 2019
Women's football clubs in Bangladesh
Sport in Dhaka